Fernando Luiz Cumplido Mac Dowell da Costa (July 7, 1945 – May 20, 2018) was a Brazilian engineer and politician. He worked in several governments in Brazil, always defending the accomplishment of great interventions in the urbanism of Rio de Janeiro. He was one of the critics of the transport system of Rio de Janeiro during the government of Sérgio Cabral.

Career 
He worked at GEIPOT, a transport company created in 1965 by the military regime. He graduated in engineering from the University of the State of Rio de Janeiro (UERJ) in 1969 and soon afterwards became a professor at the same university. In the 1980s, he was director of the Carioca subway, when line 1 began to function during the term of Chagas Freitas as governor of the state. He was president of Emop during the government of Moreira Franco and was considered a candidate for his succession, but he affirmed to have broken with the latter due to the fact that the government tried to inaugurate the Viaduto do Joa without it being in conditions.

He also participated in the second government of Leonel Brizola, from 1991 to 1994, being an arduous defender of the subway system. Also participated in the construction of the Red Line. Recognized as one of the greatest experts in the area in the country, he made several criticisms of Brazil's subway systems, even saying in 2009 that "metro in Brazil only exists in São Paulo, Rio and Distrito Federal."  Also made several critics to the works of expansion of the subway realized during the government of Sérgio Cabral. In 2015, it visited ghost stations, that affirmed that they had been ready since the decade of 1980, but that never they were inaugurated.

He joined the Liberal Party (PL) in the decade of 2010 and was elected vice mayor of Rio de Janeiro in the 2016 elections, on the plate of Marcelo Crivella.

Death 
He died on May 20, 2018, of a heart attack at age 72. The mayor of Rio de Janeiro decreed official mourning of three days for his death. After his death, an important highway in Rio de Janeiro city was renamed after him, the Lagoa–Barra Highway as Engenheiro Fernando Mac Dowell Highway ("Engenheiro" means Engineer in Portuguese).

References 

1945 births
2018 deaths
Brazilian engineers
People from Rio de Janeiro (city)
Liberal Party (Brazil, 2006) politicians